Dar Shorouq is an Arabic publishing house based in Beirut and Cairo. It publishes books in politics, biographies, memoirs, history, philosophy, social sciences, religion, nationalist thought, and art as well as children's books.

History 
Muhammad al-Mu'allem (1918 - 1994) established Dar Shorouq in 1968, crowning a career in publishing that began in the early 1940s with a simplified science book written by the physicist Ali Moustafa Mosharafa until the company's nationalization in 1966. He started the venture with Ibrahim al-Mu'allem in Cairo and Beirut.

The administration is composed of Ibrahim El Mu'allem, president; the engineer Aadel al-Mu'allem, vice president; Ahmed az-Ziadi, general director of publishing; Amira Abulmajd, director of children's book publishing; and Helmi at-Touni, artistic director.

Dar Shorouq employs approximately 1200 staff members—directors, engineers, editors, artists, administrators, and workers. Dar Shorouq has a wide distribution network with agencies in most parts of the world, and a number of offices in Cairo and Beirut.

Cultural activities 
Dar Shorouq is considered the first Egyptian publishing house to have participated in the Frankfurt Book Fair and the Bologna Children's Book Fair.

Publications 
Dar Shorouq publishes a number of Arab writers including Naguib Mahfouz, Mohamed Hassanein Heikal, Ahmed Zewail, Tharwat Okasha, Zaki Naguib Mahmoud, Tawfiq al-Hakim, Mohammed al-Ghazali, Yusuf Idris, Yusuf al-Qaradawi, Mahmud Shaltut, Salah Abdel Sabour, Anis Mansour, Fahmi Huwaidi, Ahmed Bahgat, Rajaa an-Niqaash, Muhammad Salmawi, Abdel Wahab El-Messiri, Radwa Ashour, Mourid Barghouti, Tamim al-Barghouti, Farouk Gouida, Gamal El-Ghitani, Galal Amin, Ibrahim Aslan, Ahmed Khaled Tawfik, Alaa Al Aswany, Ahmed Mourad, Muhammad Sayyid Tantawy, Abd al-Wahhab Al-Bayati, Muhammad Imara, Mohamed Makhzangi, Ibrahim Abdel Meguid, Boutros Boutros-Ghali, Ahmed Asmat Abdel-Meguid, Mohammad Salim Al-Awa, Tarek El-Bishry, Ahmad Fathi Sorour, Radwa El Aswad and others.

Dar Shorouq also publishes works translated into Arabic.

External links 
 Website

References 

Conglomerate companies of Egypt
Publishing companies established in 1968
Publishing companies of Egypt
1968 establishments in Egypt